Tsaghkashen or Damirli is a village that is, de facto,  in the Martakert Province of the breakaway Republic of Artsakh; de jure, it is in the Tartar District of Azerbaijan, in the disputed region of Nagorno-Karabakh. The village has an ethnic Armenian-majority population, and also had an Armenian majority in 1989.

History 
During the Soviet period, the village was part of the Mardakert District of the Nagorno-Karabakh Autonomous Oblast.

During the First Nagorno-Karabakh War, the village was under the control of Armenian troops by the first half of 1992, then captured by Azerbaijani troops in 4 July 1992 during Operation Goranboy. Finally it was captured by Armenian forces on 27 July 1993.

Economy and culture 
The population is mainly engaged in agriculture and animal husbandry. As of 2015, the village has a municipal building, a house of culture, the Tsaghkashen branch of the Nerkin Horatagh secondary school, and a medical centre.

Demographics 
The village had 137 inhabitants in 2005, and 154 inhabitants in 2015.

References

External links 
 

Populated places in Martakert Province
Populated places in Tartar District